The Grandval Dam is a dam in the French region Massif central, which opened in 1960. It was conceived by architects Henri et Louis Marty. It is located on the Truyère river, in the departement of Cantal, in between the communes of Fridefont et de Lavastrie.

Dams in France
Massif Central